The Sabang tree frog (Nyctimystes sanguinolenta) is a species of frog in the subfamily Pelodryadinae. It is endemic to West Papua, Indonesia. Its natural habitats are subtropical or tropical moist lowland forests.

References
 

Nyctimystes
Amphibians of Western New Guinea
Amphibians described in 1909
Taxonomy articles created by Polbot
Taxobox binomials not recognized by IUCN